Kevork Mardirossian is an American violinist currently the James H. Rudy Professor of Music at Indiana University and the Plovdiv Philharmonic Orchestra's concertmaster and then also, from 1988 to 1990, for Baton Rouge Symphony.
Maestro Mardirossian. Was Violin Master and Professor at the University of Central Arkansas. His contribution to the Students under him are much appreciated.

References

Year of birth missing (living people)
Living people
Indiana University faculty
American violinists
Alumni of the Guildhall School of Music and Drama
21st-century violinists